The 1995 International Formula 3000 Championship was contested over eight rounds from May 7 to October 15, 1995. This was the final F3000 season in which teams could use different chassis and engines. At the final race of this season at Magny Cours, Marco Campos was killed after suffering head injuries in a crash. He was the only driver killed in International F3000.

Drivers and constructors

Calendar

Final points standings

Drivers' Championship

Notes 
Results in bold indicate pole position.
Results in italics indicate fastest lap.

Complete Overview 

R13=retired, but classified R=retired NS=did not start NQ=did not qualify NT=no time set in qualifying DIS(18)=disqualified after finishing in eighteenth place (11)=place after practice, but grid position not held free 14E=grid position, but started from the end of the grid

References 

International Formula 3000
International Formula 3000 seasons